The 2017–18 La Liga season, also known as LaLiga Santander for sponsorship reasons, was the 87th since its establishment. The season began on 18 August 2017 and concluded on 20 May 2018. The fixtures were released on 21 July 2017.

Real Madrid were the defending champions. Barcelona, under new manager Ernesto Valverde, won the league title on 29 April 2018 with four matches to spare. It was the second part of a double-winning season for Barcelona, who also won the 2018 Copa del Rey Final.	

Levante, Girona and Getafe were the newly promoted clubs competing in the season, with Girona entering La Liga for the first time in its history. At the end of the season, Málaga, Las Palmas and Deportivo La Coruña were all relegated to the Segunda División.

Summary
Prior to the season, several teams hired new managers, among them the previous season's runners-up Barcelona, who enlisted the services of Ernesto Valverde from Athletic Bilbao after the exit of Luis Enrique. Meanwhile, Valencia, who had struggled in the previous campaign hired Marcelino.

In the transfer window, Barcelona were involved in the new world record transfer, selling Brazilian forward Neymar to French club Paris Saint-Germain for €222 million. They replaced him with young Frenchman Ousmane Dembélé, who signed for an initial €105 million fee that could rise to €150 million. Defending champions Real Madrid sold striker Álvaro Morata to Chelsea for €80 million and lost veteran defender Pepe to Turkey's Beşiktaş on a free transfer, while its largest fee paid during the window was €24 million for young defender Theo Hernandez from city rivals Atlético Madrid.

Barcelona first topped the table on 16 September after winning 5–0 in its third match of the season against neighbours Espanyol, eventually making a run of seven wins from the start of the season that ended with a 1–1 draw at Atlético Madrid. Valencia improved on its previous campaign and began its new season well, with Marcelino getting the best out of players such as Italian striker Simone Zaza and on-loan Portuguese winger Gonçalo Guedes. Real Madrid struggled in the first half of the season, with problems including a smaller squad, injuries and the comparatively poorer goalscoring form of Cristiano Ronaldo relative to recent seasons.

In January 2018, Barcelona added to its attack by spending €160 million on Brazilian Philippe Coutinho from Liverpool, while the end of a transfer ban allowed Atlético to register Diego Costa and Vitolo for action. Real Madrid manager Zinedine Zidane made no signings. Málaga were the first team to be relegated, ending its ten-season stay in La Liga with its descent confirmed after a 0–1 loss against Levante on 19 April. Three days later, Las Palmas' relegation was also confirmed after the Canarian team lost 0–4 at home to Alavés to end its three-year top flight status.

On 29 April, Barcelona sealed its 25th league title with a 4–2 win at Deportivo de La Coruña, with Lionel Messi scoring a hat-trick. Barcelona still had four matches to play, and it was the second part of its double, having earlier won the 2018 Copa del Rey Final. The result also made Deportivo the final of the three relegated teams, sending them back to Segunda División for the first time in four years.

A day later, Real Betis, under new manager Quique Setién, booked its entry to the UEFA Europa League following a 2–1 win over Málaga. Betis had a chance of occupying Spain's fourth UEFA Champions League spot after Barcelona, Atlético Madrid and Real Madrid, but that was soon taken by Valencia, which returned to the competition for the first time in three years. In its second-last match of the season, Sevilla drew 2–2 with city rivals Betis to confirm seventh place and qualification for the UEFA Europa League at the expense of Getafe. Barcelona were on track to complete the first unbeaten La Liga season since the Spanish Civil War (and first in a 38-match season), but surprisingly lost its 37th match 4–5 at Levante, having only conceded 24 goals all season to that point.

Teams

Promotion and relegation (pre-season)
A total of 20 teams competed in the league: the 17 sides from the 2016–17 season and the three promoted from the 2016–17 Segunda División. This latter three included the two top teams from the Segunda División and the winners of the play-offs.

Levante was the first team from Segunda División to achieve promotion, after a one-year absence from La Liga, on 29 April 2017 after winning 1–0 against Oviedo. Girona were promoted as the runners-up after drawing 0–0 against Zaragoza on 4 June 2017, this was its first promotion to the top division. It became the 62nd team to participate in the Spanish top level league. Getafe was the last to be promoted after defeating Huesca and Tenerife in the play-offs, one year after its relegation.

The three promoted clubs replaced Sporting Gijón, Osasuna and Granada, which were relegated at the end of the previous season.

Stadia and locations

Atlético Madrid played for the first season at their new stadium, Wanda Metropolitano, replacing the Vicente Calderón Stadium, where they played since its opening in 1966.

Deportivo La Coruña signed a sponsorship contract with Abanca for renaming their stadium as Abanca-Riazor.

Real Betis completed their stadium renovation and it was grown to 60,720 seats, becoming the fourth biggest stadium in Spain. Meanwhile, after their first promotion ever to La Liga, Girona expanded Estadi Montilivi temporarily for hosting 13,450 spectators.

Personnel and sponsorship

1. On the back of shirt.
2. On the sleeves.
3. On the shorts.

Managerial changes

League table

Standings

Results

Season statistics

Scoring
First goal of the season:   Gabriel for Leganés against Alavés (18 August 2017)
Last goal of the season:   Philippe Coutinho for Barcelona against Real Sociedad (20 May 2018)

Top goalscorers

Zamora Trophy
The Zamora Trophy was awarded by newspaper Marca to the goalkeeper with the lowest goals-to-games ratio. A goalkeeper had to have played at least 28 games of 60 or more minutes to be eligible for the trophy.

Hat-tricks

Note
4 Player scored 4 goals; (H) – Home ; (A) – Away

Discipline

 Most yellow cards (club): 134
 Getafe
 Fewest yellow cards (club): 62
 Real Sociedad
 Most yellow cards (player): 16
  Jefferson Lerma (Levante)
 Most red cards (club): 8
 Málaga
 Fewest red cards (club): 0
 Athletic Bilbao
 Girona
 Most red cards (player): 2
  Jordi Amat (Real Betis)
  Zdravko Kuzmanović (Málaga)
  Sergio Ramos (Real Madrid)
  Sergi Roberto (Barcelona)

Overall
Most wins - Barcelona (28)
Fewest wins - Las Palmas and Malaga (5)
Most draws - Espanyol, Levante and Bilbao (13)
Fewest draws - Alavés (2)
Most losses - Malaga (28)
Fewest losses - Barcelona (1)
Most goals scored - Barcelona (99)
Fewest goals scored - Las Palmas and Malaga (24)
Most goals conceded - Deportivo La Coruña (76)
Fewest goals conceded - Atlético Madrid (22)

Average attendances 
A match played behind closed doors is not included.

LFP Awards

Monthly

Number of teams by autonomous community 
Source:

Notes

References

External links

LaLiga 2017-2018 Estadísticas, noticias, informaciones sobre el fútbol en España

 
2017-18
Spain
1